Proctor is a census-designated place (CDP) that comprises the northern half of the town of Proctor, Rutland County, Vermont, United States, including the unincorporated village of Proctor. As of the 2020 census, the CDP had a population of 1,565, out of 1,763 in the entire town.

The CDP is in north-central Rutland County, in the valley of Otter Creek and climbing the steep hillsides on each side. The village is sited where the creek drops over Sutherland Falls, with the Vermont Marble Museum occupying a building of the former Vermont Marble Company overlooking the falls.

References 

Populated places in Rutland County, Vermont
Census-designated places in Rutland County, Vermont
Census-designated places in Vermont